Monte Luke born Charles Robert Montague Luke, (1885–1962) was an Australian photographer, actor and director.

Biography
Born in Geelong he worked as an actor on stage before developing an interest in stills photography. He was appointed official photographer for J. C. Williamson, taking portraits of stage stars and publicity shots of plays in production. In 1915 he was placed in charge of film production for J. C. Williamson Ltd after Fred Niblo left the country, and directed three features for them. He then set up a photography studio and became one of the leading photographers in the country.

Select filmography
For Australia (1915) - director
Within the Law (1916) - director
Seven Keys to Baldpate (1916) - director
The Monk and the Woman (1917) - actor

References

External links
 
 Collection of Monte Luke at Art Gallery of New South Wales
 Biography at Monte Luke Studios website
 Monte Luke at National Film and Sound Archive

Australian film directors
1885 births
1962 deaths